Pukar is a Punjabi language film from 1984. It was written and produced in Pakistan. Screenwriter was Syed Noor, and the film was produced and directed by Aizaz Syed. It was his directorial debut. The cast included Sultan Rahi, Mustafa Qureshi, and Mumtaz.

Cast 
 Sultan Rahi
 Mumtaz
 Mustafa Qureshi
 Zumurrud
 Sangeeta
 Nimmo
 Talat Siddiqi
 Adeeb
 Bahar
 Shenshah
 Zaman Ullah
 Kajol
 Saleem Hassan
 Jangir Mugal
 Anwar Khan
 Azhar Khan
 Konnil Bobby
 Shazia Hassan

Songs (album)

References

External links 
 
 

Pakistani action films
Pakistani crime films
Pakistani fantasy films
Punjabi-language Pakistani films
1984 films
1980s Punjabi-language films
1980s romance films